The Gaithersburg Latitude Observatory is a historic astronomical observatory on DeSellum Avenue in Gaithersburg, Maryland.  It was established in 1899 as part of a system of six International Latitude Observatories to precisely measure the wobble of the Earth's rotating axis.  The observatory building and adjacent monuments were designated a National Historic Landmark in 1989 as a testament to international scientific cooperation.  The observatory was taken out of service in 1982 after automation eliminated the need for human observations; the property is now owned by the city.

History
The Gaithersburg Latitude Observatory was one of six observatories — and one of the four original observatories built by 1899 — tracking the degree of "wobble" occurring on the earth's north-south axis and resultant variation of latitude.  The Observatory — along with observatories in Cincinnati, Ohio; Ukiah, California; Mizusawa, Japan; Charjui in Russian Turkestan; and Carloforte, Sardina, Italy — performed in concert to carry out a coordinated program of star observation designed to investigate and calculate the degree of earth "wobble" or latitude variation.

On the grounds of the Gaithersburg Latitude Observatory stands a plaque that reads:

This small framed structure played a key role in the scientific investigation of the Earth's rotation. In 1898, the International Geodetic Association established a network of observatories to measure the wobble of the planet on its axis by plotting the locations of specific stars.  This hilltop in Gaithersburg was chosen together with sites in California, Italy, Japan, and the Soviet Union. All five lay along the same latitude (39° 8' N).  The American Stations were supervised by the U.S. Coast and Geodetic Survey.  The observatory's roof was designed to part in the middle on two sets of tracks to expose the reflecting telescope inside to the night sky.  Its slatted exterior walls stabilize the inside air to limit the effects of the temperatures on the accuracy of the telescope. The building's white paint minimizes heat retention that creates air turbulence around the telescope at night, distorting the stars.  Knowledge gained from the observations recorded here nightly until 1982 assisted scientists in the study of the Earth's geophysical make-up and aided spacecraft orbiting the planet and navigating the universe.

A second portion of the observatory was constructed to house the Photographic Zenith Tube.  The observers used the Photographic Zenith Tube to capture picture data using the Zenith telescope as a guide of alignment and star track.  However, nothing now remains of this addition to the Gaithersburg Latitude Observatory.

History
The Gaithersburg observatory was established as part of the International Polar Motion Service in 1899. The Gaithersburg observatory was built by Edwin Smith, chief of the Instrument Division of the U.S. Coast and Geodetic Survey, who had conducted similar measurements as a volunteer in 1891-92 from his home in Rockville, Maryland. During its operation twelve groups of stars were studied in the program, each group containing six pairs of stars. Each night, the station observed two of the star groups along a preset schedule and later compared the data against the measurements taken by the five sister stations. The station operated on this schedule until 1915, when it was temporarily closed as a result of economy measures. Operations resumed in 1932 and continued until 1982 when advances in computer technology and satellite observations rendered it obsolete, although data collected by the observatory over the years still has use to scientists, and has been applied to studies of polar motion, the physical properties of the Earth, climatology and satellite tracking and navigation.

Description
The Gaithersburg Latitude Observatory stands on the north side of DeSellum Avenue, just north of the Gaithersburg High School campus. The building measures  square with a small gable-roofed louvered entrance porch on the west side. There is a small shed-roofed addition on the east side. The structure rests on a mortar and fieldstone foundation. Each gable features a decorative wood five-pointed star. A metal ventilator is mounted over each half-section's roof, topped with similar metal star. A system of metal-capped wood rails allows the building to be pulled apart in the middle using ropes and pulleys. The halves operate independently.

On the interior, a double floor surrounds a pyramidal concrete pier that supported the observing instruments.

The site was extensively surveyed and documented to support its mission. Five Coast and Geodetic Survey monuments are on the property. The RM-1 monument has been used by NOAA for testing associated with the Global Positioning Satellite system.

See also
List of astronomical observatories
List of National Historic Landmarks in Maryland
National Register of Historic Places listings in Montgomery County, Maryland

References

External links
City web site about the observatory
1989 Drawings of the Gaithersburg Latitude Observatory at the Library of Congress
, including photo in 1991, at Maryland Historical Trust

National Historic Landmarks in Maryland
Government buildings on the National Register of Historic Places in Maryland
Government buildings completed in 1899
Historic districts on the National Register of Historic Places in Maryland
Astronomical observatories in Maryland
Buildings and structures in Gaithersburg, Maryland
Historic American Engineering Record in Maryland
1899 establishments in Maryland
National Register of Historic Places in Montgomery County, Maryland